Mr Tiz (2 February 1984 – 30 January 2014) was a champion New Zealand thoroughbred racehorse. He is best known for his three consecutive wins in the Railway Stakes (1,200 metres) at Ellerslie, the country's premier sprint race for thoroughbreds.  Mr Tiz remains the only horse to have achieved this feat.  Furthermore, he also won New Zealand's other major sprint race, the Telegraph Handicap (1,200 metres) on two occasions.

Background
Trained at Matamata by Dave and Paul O'Sullivan, the gelding was bred in Australia by International Thoroughbred Breeders, Inc. He raced 36 times for 17 wins, two seconds and six-thirds. Dave O'Sullivan, one of the most successful trainers in New Zealand racing history, labelled Mr Tiz "the greatest racehorse I've ever trained".

Racing career
Mr Tiz showed his potential from very early in his career, being placed in his first two starts before a maiden win at Paeroa at his third raceday appearance. From there, his career took off - he won the Hawke's Bay Guineas in just the fourth start of his career.

But it was as a four-year-old, in the 1988–89 season, that his true ability was observed. He dead-heated with another excellent New Zealand sprinter, Westminster, in the Railway.  Three weeks later, he won his first Telegraph, completing a rare Railway-Telegraph double.  Incredibly, in winning the Telegraph, he also dead-heated - this time with Festal.

He won both races again in the 1989–90 season, and completed his unprecedented Railway treble in 1991. That win has been claimed as one of the greatest sprint victories in New Zealand. Carrying 59 kg, Mr Tiz was severely checked and all but fell at about the 600-metre mark, and went to the back of the field.  Yet from that impossible position, under a huge weight - and in a sprint race - Mr Tiz, ridden by regular jockey Lance O'Sullivan, stormed along the rail to win. The style of the win was "absolutely unforgettable". Later in the month, he finished second in the Telegraph, carrying a crushing 60.5 kg - and handicap weight given due to his brilliance.

Three months later came arguably his greatest performance. Unlike stayers, few New Zealand sprinters cross the Tasman and have success against the best Australian sprinters in their own backyard.  In April 1991, Mr Tiz won The Galaxy in Sydney, one of the premier sprint races in Australia. Just like the Railway victory a few months beforehand, what made this win more remarkable was the manner in which he won the race. Near the back of the field at the home turn, and seemingly in a hopeless position with 300 metres to run, Mr Tiz showed a breathtaking turn of foot and made up an extraordinary amount of ground to record one of the greatest wins by a New Zealand horse on Australian soil.  His trainer, Dave O'Sullvan, recounts: "I still can't believe how he won the Galaxy. He had 10 horses in front of him and he nearly fell trying to make his run. It was incredible. I still get the video out from time to time and it never fails to amaze me".

In the last start of his career, Mr Tiz finished third in the Group 1 Gadsden at Flemington in Melbourne.

Retirement, legacy and death
In a country where stayers are more esteemed than sprinters, Mr Tiz is well considered a champion in his class. He is honoured with a race carrying his name at Ellerslie, the scene of his historic Railway treble. The Mr Tiz Trophy is a listed stakes race for three-year-old horses over 1200m. It is run on the third and final day of Auckland Cup Week, the most prestigious week of racing on the New Zealand calendar.

Mr Tiz died 30 January 2014, at the age of 29.

See also
 Thoroughbred racing in New Zealand

References 

Racehorses bred in Australia
Racehorses trained in Australia
Racehorses trained in New Zealand
1984 racehorse births
2014 racehorse deaths
Thoroughbred family 13-a
Matamata